Hickleton is a village and civil parish in the City of Doncaster in South Yorkshire, England. Historically part of the West Riding of Yorkshire, it had a population of 291, which had reduced slightly to 274 at the 2011 Census.

There are records of Hickleton's history dating back to Saxon times although some consider the settlement to have Roman roots.

More recently, it was the "estate village" of Hickleton Hall, formerly the home of the Earls of Halifax and then a Sue Ryder Care Home until 2013.

The parish church, St. Wilfrid's, is mainly of mediaeval construction with Norman features that was restored in Victorian times by George Frederick Bodley.

Two locations in Hickleton appear in the top ten worst locations in England for air quality; the village has the most polluted air in Yorkshire. There have been numerous campaigns to construct a bypass around the village and Marr to the east.

See also
Listed buildings in Hickleton

References

External links 
 Hickleton Local History Society website

Villages in Doncaster
Civil parishes in South Yorkshire